The Victory Cup is an international rugby league tournament in Russia.

Victory Cup may also refer to:

 1919 Victory Cup, a one-off Scottish football competition
 1946 Victory Cup, a one-off Scottish football competition
 Victory Cup, a 2013–2015 soccer competition in the National Premier Leagues Tasmania, Australia
 Brisbane Cup, renamed Victory Cup for the 1946 race, an Australian Thoroughbred horse race